The Jijia is a river in Ukraine and the Moldavia region of Romania, a right tributary of the Prut. It rises in Ukraine at an altitude of 410 metres, flows south in Botoșani County through the town of Dorohoi and meets the Prut in Gorban, Iași County. Major tributaries are the rivers Sitna, Miletin and Bahlui.

Tributaries

The following rivers are tributaries to the river Jijia (from source to mouth):

Left: Tinca, Pârâul lui Martin, Bezerc, Putreda, Tălpeni, Săvescu, Ibăneasa, Ghițălăria, Buzunosu, Găinăria, Guranda, Gard, Mihăiasa, Ciornohal, Glăvănești, Iepureni, Hărbărău, Puturosul, Pop, Frasin.
Right: Buhai, La Iazul cel Mare, Părul, Valea Iazurilor, Lunca, Drâslea, Sitna, Aluza, Miletin, Jijioara, Jirinca, Bahlui, Tamarca, Comarna, Covasna

References

Rivers of Romania
Rivers of Chernivtsi Oblast
 
Rivers of Botoșani County
Rivers of Iași County
International rivers of Europe